The men's pole vault event at the 1966 European Indoor Games was held on 27 March in Dortmund.

Results

References

Pole vault at the European Athletics Indoor Championships
Pole